South Cascade Glacier is a large alpine glacier in the North Cascades of Washington, USA. Meltwater from the glacier flows directly into South Cascade Lake, which feeds the South Fork Cascade River, which is a tributary of the Skagit River.

South Cascade Glacier is one of the four "benchmark glaciers" that is monitored by the USGS and its mass balance has been monitored since 1959. Its area has declined from 2.71 km2 in 1958 to 1.8 km2 in 2015 representing an area loss of 34%. Between 1958 and 2009 South Cascade Glacier lost nearly a half of its volume.

See also
 Ptarmigan Traverse
 Retreat of glaciers since 1850
 List of glaciers in the United States

References

Glaciers of the North Cascades
North Cascades of Washington (state)
Glaciers of Skagit County, Washington
Mount Baker-Snoqualmie National Forest
Glaciers of Washington (state)